Bertram Charles Butler is a former Canadian diplomat. He was High Commissioner to Singapore then concurrently the Ambassador Extraordinary and Plenipotentiary to Thailand and Myanmar and High Commissioner to Malaysia.

External links 
 Foreign Affairs and International Trade Canada Complete List of Posts

Year of birth missing (living people)
Living people
High Commissioners of Canada to Singapore
Ambassadors of Canada to Thailand
Ambassadors of Canada to Myanmar
High Commissioners of Canada to Malaysia